Emery Nziyunvira (born 19 March 1984) is a Burundian former swimmer, who specialized in sprint freestyle events. At the 2004 Summer Olympics in Athens, Nziyunvira was elected by the Burundi National Olympic Committee to carry the nation's flag in the opening ceremony. He qualified for the men's 100 m freestyle, by receiving a Universality place from FINA in an entry time of 1:09.84. He challenged six other swimmers in heat one, including 34-year-old Mumtaz Ahmed of Pakistan. He rounded out the field to last place in a lifetime best of 1:09.40, exactly 43 seconds faster than a historic record time of 1:52.72, held by Equatorial Guinea's Eric Moussambani in 2000. Nziyunvira failed to advance into the semifinals, as he placed sixty-ninth overall out of 71 swimmers in the preliminaries.

References

1984 births
Living people
Burundian male freestyle swimmers
Olympic swimmers of Burundi
Swimmers at the 2004 Summer Olympics